Country Davis is an American former Negro league outfielder who played in the 1930s.

Davis played for the Homestead Grays in 1939. In 13 recorded games, he posted 12 hits with a home run and seven RBI in 51 plate appearances.

References

External links
 and Seamheads

Year of birth missing
Place of birth missing
Homestead Grays players
Baseball outfielders